Saas, SAAS, or SaaS may refer to:

 Seattle Academy of Arts and Sciences
 Société Anonyme des Ateliers de Sécheron, a Swiss manufacturing company
 Social Accountability Accreditation Services that accredits according to the SA8000 certification standard
 Software as a service (SaaS)
 Security as a service (SaaS)
 South Australian Ambulance Service
 Sports Association for Adelaide Schools, a school sports association in South Australia
 Student Awards Agency for Scotland
Singapore Association for the Advancement of Science (SAAS)
St. Anselm's Abbey School, a Catholic high school in Washington, D.C.

Places in Switzerland
Saas im Prättigau, in the Canton of Graubünden
Saas railway station, a Rhaetian Railway station
Saas-Almagell, in the Canton of Valais
Saas-Balen, in the Canton of Valais
Saas-Fee, in the Canton of Valais
Saas-Grund, in the Canton of Valais
Saastal, a valley in the Canton of Valais

See also
 SAA (disambiguation)
 Saaz (disambiguation)
 Sass (disambiguation)
 SSAS (disambiguation)
 SAS (disambiguation)